The Spanish People's Union (UDPE) was a conservative and Spanish nationalist political party in Spain.

History
UDPE was created in 1975, initially under the name of People's Alliance, on 11 February 1975. The group changed its name to Spanish People's Union the 22 May 1975. It was officially recognized and definitely by the Movimiento Nacional on 28 July 1975. The "political associations" were the result of development of the Organic Law of the State of 1966, and sought to promote a very limited and controlled "pluralism" within Francoist Spain.

The Spanish People's Union was led by the, then Minister of Education, Cruz Martínez Esteruelas and the general secretary of the Movimiento Nacional Adolfo Suárez. The Spanish People's Union wanted to group the ruling politicians of Francoism, very attached to the bureaucratic apparatus of the Movement. On July 11, 1975 Adolfo Suarez become the president of the UDPE, until the 12 of December, when he left to be the secretary general of the Movimiento Nacional again.

On 22 and 23 June 1976 the UDPE held its first congress in Madrid, where the association decided to become a political party -which occurred on September 17, 1976- and Cruz Martínez Esteruelas was confirmed as the president of the party.

UDPE joined the People's Alliance (AP) with other political forces on October 9, 1976. Its dissolution took place on May 4, 1977, to merge with Regional Action, Social Democracy, Democratic Reform and the Social Popular Union.

References

Conservative parties in Spain
Political parties established in 1975
Political parties disestablished in 1977
Catholic political parties
1975 establishments in Spain
1977 disestablishments in Spain